Tara (born 3 August 1944 in Imphal, Manipur, India) was an Indian actress, who has worked in Assamese, Manipuri, Punjabi and Hindi films in a career extending more than 50 years. Her prominent features include Halodhia Choraye Baodhan Khai, which won the National Film Award for Best Feature Film in 1988, Banaras - A Mystic Love Story, and Shakuntala, directed by Bhupen Hazarika.
She died 19 May 2007 in Gauhati, Assam.

Filmography
 Kahani Gudiya Ki (2007)
 Banaras (2006) or Banaras: A Mystic Love Story
 Jee Aayan Nu (2003)
 Meemanxa (1994) or The Verdict (India: English title)
 Ishanou (1990) or The Chosen One (International: English title)
 Ajala Kokai (1989)
 Kolahal (1988) or The Turmoil (International: English title)
 Halodhia Choraye Baodhan Khai (1987), The Catastrophe or, The Yellow Birds
 Sandhya Raag (1977)
 Aranya (1971)
 Aparajeya (1970) or The Unvanquished
 Dr. Bezbarua (1969)
 Maram Trishna (1968)
 Ito Sito Bahuto (1963) or Lots of Things Around
 Shakuntala (1961)
 Ranga Police (1958) or Red-capped Police
 Mak Aru Marom (10/05/1957) or, Mother and Love

References

External links 

1944 births
2007 deaths
20th-century Indian actresses
Actresses in Assamese cinema
Actresses in Meitei cinema
Actresses from Manipur
People from Imphal